The meteorological history of Hurricane Luis spanned sixteen days between August 27 to September 11, 1995. The storm originated from an area of low pressure associated with a tropical wave on August 26. The following day, the low became sufficiently organized to be classified as a tropical depression, while tracking general westward. By August 29, the depression intensified into a tropical storm and was given the name Luis by the National Hurricane Center. Luis attained hurricane status the following day as an eye began to develop.

Early on September 3, winds within the eyewall reached . Luis weakened slightly maintained this intensity until September 5, shortly before passing through the Leeward Islands with  winds. The hurricane maintained Category 4 status until September 7 as it tracked towards the northwest. The next day, Luis began to undergo an extratropical transition and the storm's forward motion rapidly increased. The same day, a  wave produced by Luis struck an ocean liner. This wave is the largest ever recorded, Several hours later, the storm completed its extratropical transition as it began to be absorbed into an approaching trough. The following day, the remnants of Luis were fully absorbed into the trough near the southern coast of Greenland.

Formation and intensification

On August 26, the National Hurricane Center (NHC) began monitoring a tropical wave between the western coast of Africa and the Cape Verde Islands. Later that day, a low-level circulation center formed beneath the wave and began strengthening. Operationally, the NHC did not begin to issue advisories on the depression until 2100 UTC on August 28. Tracking nearly due west in response to an anticyclone to the north and an area of moderate wind shear, the depression was forecast to slowly strengthen over the next several days. Early on August 29, satellite intensity estimates of maximum sustained winds within the depression reached , indicating that it had intensified into a tropical storm. At this time, the NHC assigned the name Luis to the system. Gradual strengthening took place throughout August 29 as Luis tracked towards the west-northwest. Increased wind shear displaced convection from the center of circulation, preventing further intensification.

By August 30, strong outflow developed around Luis despite convection remaining displaced from the low pressure center. Once the shear began to relent, shower and thunderstorm activity redeveloped around the center, allowing the storm to intensify. Around 1800 UTC that day, Luis attained Category 1 hurricane status on the Saffir–Simpson hurricane scale; however, operationally Luis was not upgraded to a hurricane until 0900 UTC on August 31. The newly upgraded hurricane steadily intensified as banding features developed around the periphery of the cyclone. By the morning of August 31, cold cloud tops surrounded a developing eye. Around this time, Luis was located due south of the area of high pressure and tracking steadily towards the west-northwest. Further development resulted in the appearance of a ragged eye appearing on visible satellite images. Later that day, the storm became increasingly organized, with a symmetrical structure and a well-defined center. The NHC forecast the hurricane to peak as a Category 3 hurricane in 36 hours before interacting with Hurricane Iris and Tropical Storm Karen.

Peak intensity and the Leeward Islands

Subsequent to doing so, its intensity remained steady for 42 hours while it tracked nearly due west. Continuing on a westward track, the forward motion of the hurricane decreased to  later on September 3.

With a Category 4 hurricane forecast to track directly over the Leeward Islands, hurricane warnings were issued for several islands by September 4. Outflow to the north of the hurricane weakened slightly as a distinct area of dry air developed around the weakening ridge. Late on September 4, the hurricane's eye began to shrink, a possible indication of strengthening. An area of low pressure over Florida cut off from a trough would eventually cause Luis to slow significantly and cause a northward turn. The eyewall of the storm brushed Antigua, Saint Barthélemy, St. Martin and Anguilla. The eye of Luis was estimated to be  in diameter at this time. Operationally, the NHC briefly downgraded Luis to a Category 3 hurricane as it passed through the islands due to the formation of concentric eyewalls; however, in post-season analysis, it was determined that the storm never weakened below Category 4 status while passing through the Leeward Islands.

Bermuda and dissipation
Tracking away from the Leeward Islands on September 6, Luis maintained Category 4 status for another 24 hours before downgrading to a Category 3 hurricane. A strong mid- to upper-level low located over the Gulf of Mexico was forecast to steer the hurricane in a general northeastern direction. The NHC anticipated re-strengthening as the central pressure decreased. Tracking around the periphery of the ridge of high pressure, Luis began to slow. Late on September 7, a double eye featured developed, indicating an eyewall replacement cycle, with the strongest winds being recorded in the outer eyewall. Tracking towards the north-northwest, Luis was forecast to move over an area of cooler waters upwelled by Hurricane Felix.

Later that day, the storm began to accelerate as it traveled northeast ahead of a strong trough located to the northwest of Luis. During the afternoon of September 10, Hurricane Luis began to undergo an extratropical transition as it rapidly approached the Canadian coastline. Due to the rapid movement of the storm, significant weakening did not occur until Luis was at an unusually high latitude.

During the afternoon of September 10, the central pressure of the storm decreased to  but sustained winds did not exceed  according to the NHC. Luis maintained this intensity until it made landfall on the Avalon Peninsula in eastern Newfoundland early on September 11. While tracking over Newfoundland, cold, dry air became entrenched in Luis's circulation and the system began to merge with the approaching trough. The extratropical remnants persisted for 30 more hours over the North Atlantic Ocean before being absorbed by the trough near the southern coast of Greenland late on September 12.

Records
When Tropical Depression Thirteen strengthened into Tropical Storm Luis on August 29, it marked the second earliest date on which the twelfth named storm of any season formed, before being surpassed by Hurricane Laura which formed on August 21, 2020. On September 11, a  wave struck an ocean liner.

See also

Hurricane Luis
1995 Atlantic hurricane season
List of tropical cyclones
Saffir–Simpson hurricane scale

References

External links

The National Hurricane Center's report on Hurricane Luis
Canadian Hurricane Centre's assessment of the 1995 season

Luis
Luis, Meteorological history of hurricane